The Next :15 is an American reality television series that premiered on February 10, 2016, on the TV One cable network. The show chronicles the next chapter in the careers of six reality television veterans.

Cast
 Tiffany Pollard  former cast member of Celebrity Big Brother, Flavor of Love, I Love New York,  New York Goes to Hollywood, and New York Goes to Work.
 Benzino  former cast member of Love & Hip Hop: Atlanta and Marriage Boot Camp: Reality Stars.
 Jennifer Williams  former cast member of Basketball Wives.
 Claudia Jordan  former cast member of Real Housewives of Atlanta, Celebrity Apprentice, and Celebrity Apprentice All-Stars.
 Laura Govan  former cast member of Basketball Wives LA.
 Karamo Brown  former cast member of The Real World: Philadelphia.

Episodes

See also
 15 minutes of fame

References

External links
 
 

2010s American reality television series
2016 American television series debuts
English-language television shows
Television shows set in Los Angeles
TV One (American TV channel) original programming